Basketball competitions of the 2019 European Youth Summer Olympic Festival was held in Sarhadchi Arena and European Azerbaijan School from 22 to 27 July 2019.

Medal summary

Medal table

Medalists

Participating nations
A total of 192 athletes from 14 nations competed in basketball at the 2019 European Youth Summer Olympic Festival:

 (12)
 (12)
 (12)
 (12)
 (24)
 (12)
 (12)
 (12)
 (12)
 (12)
 (12)
 (12)
 (12)
 (24)

References

External links

2019 European Youth Summer Olympic Festival
2019
2019 European Youth
2019 in basketball